Touroultia is a genus of longhorn beetles of the subfamily Lamiinae, containing the following species:

 Touroultia lordi Nearns & Tavakilian, 2012
 Touroultia obscurella (Bates, 1865)
 Touroultia swifti Nearns & Tavakilian, 2012

References

Onciderini